Antero Jorma Laukkanen (born May 30, 1958), is a Finnish priest and politician, who has represented the Christian Democrats in the City Council of Espoo since 2001 and in the Parliament of Finland since 2015. He was elected to the Parliament from the Uusimaa constituency in the 2015 elections with 2,520 votes.

Laukkanen was born in Kouvola. He was the founder of the Majakka Church in Espoo and he still serves the church as a priest.

References

External links
   

1958 births
Living people
People from Kouvola
Finnish Protestants
Christian Democrats (Finland) politicians
Members of the Parliament of Finland (2015–19)
Members of the Parliament of Finland (2019–23)